Lewandowski (feminine Lewandowska, plural Lewandowscy) is a Polish-language surname. In other languages it may be transliterated as Lewandowsky, Levandovski, Levandovsky, Levandovskyy, Levandoski, Levandovskiy.

It is the seventh most common surname in Poland (93,404 people in 2009).

It is derived from the place name Lewandów, itself derived from the Old Polish word lewanda – 'lavender' (lawenda in modern Polish). It is most frequent in mid-northern Poland, making up as much as 1.1% of the Kuyavian-Pomeranian Voivodeship's population (the record of Poland). The surname was recorded for the first time in 1673, although Lavendowski, which is probably its variant, is known since 1608.

People

Lewandowski

 Adolph J. Lewandowski (1905–1961), American football and basketball coach
 Corey Lewandowski (born 1973), American political consultant
 Edmund Lewandowski (1914–1998), American artist
 Eduard Lewandowski (born 1980), German ice hockey player
 Gina Lewandowski (born 1985), American soccer player
 Grzegorz Lewandowski (born 1969), Polish footballer
 Janusz Lewandowski (born 1951), Polish economist and politician
 Janusz Lewandowski (1931–2013), Polish diplomat
 Jozef Lewandowski (1923–2007), Polish-Swedish historian and writer
 Konrad T. Lewandowski (born 1966), Polish writer
 Louis Lewandowski (1821–1894), German composer
 Marcin Lewandowski (born 1987), Polish middle distance runner
 Mariusz Lewandowski (born 1979), Polish footballer
 Mateusz Lewandowski (born 1993), Polish footballer
 Michał Lewandowski (born 1996), Polish footballer
Michel Lewandowski (1914–1990), French footballer
 Przemysław Lewandowski, Polish rower
 Ricardo Lewandowski (born 1948), Minister of the Supreme Federal Court of Brazil
 Robert Lewandowski (born 1988), Polish footballer
 Sascha Lewandowski (1971–2016), German football manager
 Brothers Lewandowski, royal court merchants to the Bavarian court for lingerie

Levandowski
 Anthony Levandowski (born 1980), American engineer

Lewandowsky
 Max Lewandowsky (1876–1916), German neurologist
 Felix Lewandowsky (1879–1921), German dermatologist
 Stephan Lewandowsky (born 1958), Australian psychologist
 Via Lewandowsky (born 1963), German artist
 Klaus Lewandowsky (born 1937), West German sprint canoer

Lewandowska
 Iwona Lewandowska (born 1985), Polish athlete
 Janina Lewandowska, Polish pilot
 Sandra Lewandowska (born 1977), Polish politician
 Sylwia Lewandowska (born 1991), Polish rower

Other
 Mikhail Levandovsky (1890–1938), Soviet military leader

References

Polish-language surnames